Elephant is a 2019 Russian comedy-drama film directed and written by Aleksey Krasovskiy. It stars Aleksei Guskov.

Plot 
The film tells about the writer, Valentin Shubin, the author of the world-famous series of books about the Elephant Bear, going through a creative crisis.

Cast
 Aleksei Guskov as Valentin Shubin
 Ingrid Olerinskaya as Tanya
 Yan Tsapnik as Roman
 Frédéric Beigbeder as Vincent Amari
 Evgeniya Dmitrieva as Ada
 Yuliya Topolnitskaya as Nurse
 Igor Khripunov as Gangster
 Vera Gudkova as Selfie-girl
 Ivan Efremov as Doctor
 Polina Agureeva as Taisia

References

External links 
 

2019 films
2010s Russian-language films
Russian comedy-drama films
2019 comedy-drama films